
This is a list of aircraft in numerical order of manufacturer followed by alphabetical order beginning with 'M'.

Mg

MGH 
(MGH (William Monahan, Henry W Gastman, Behrend H Hallen), Newcastle, CA)
 MGH LM-1

References

Further reading

External links 

 List of Aircraft (M)

fr:Liste des aéronefs (I-M)